Bavorové ze Strakonic (Bavors of Strakonice) were a Bohemian noble family, rulers of Strakonice town and surrounding area.

Members of the family include:

Bavor I
Bavor II, Bavor the Great
Bavor III
Vilém of Strakonice
Mikuláš of Strakonice
Bavor IV (last holder of the Strakonice Castle)
Vilém (II) of Strakonice
Břeněk ze Strakonic (last member of the family; died 1404)

Bibliography 

HALADA, Jan. Lexikon české šlechty (erby, fakta, osobnosti, sídla a zajímavosti). Praha : AKROPOLIS, 1992. . Article Bavorové ze Strakonic, s. 14–15. 
KOTLÁROVÁ, Simona. Bavorové erbu střely. České Budějovice : Veduta, 2004. .
SVOBODA, Miroslav. Páni ze Strakonic : vládci Prácheňska a dobrodinci johanitů. Praha : Nakladatelství Lidové noviny, 2010. .

Bohemian noble families